Sandy Bay Airport  is located  north-east of Sandy Bay, Saskatchewan, Canada. The airport and community are on the shores of Wasawakasik Lake, which is along the course of the Churchill River.

See also 
 List of airports in Saskatchewan
 Sandy Bay Water Aerodrome

References 

Registered aerodromes in Saskatchewan